Gerard van Honthorst (Dutch: Gerrit van Honthorst; 4 November 1592 – 27 April 1656) was a Dutch Golden Age painter who became known for his depiction of artificially lit scenes, eventually receiving the nickname Gherardo delle Notti ("Gerard of the Nights"). Early in his career he visited Rome, where he had great success painting in a style influenced by Caravaggio. Following his return to the Netherlands he became a leading portrait painter. Van Honthorst's contemporaries included Utrecht painters Hendrick Ter Brugghen and Dirck van Baburen.

Early life

 

Van Honthorst was born in Utrecht, the son of a decorative painter, and trained under his father, and then under Abraham Bloemaert.

Italy
Having completed his education, Honthorst went to Italy, where he is first recorded in 1616. He was one of the artists from Utrecht who went to Rome at around this time, all of whom were to be deeply influenced by the recent art they encountered there. They were named the Utrecht caravaggisti. The other three were Dirk van Baburen, Hendrick ter Bruggen and Jan van Bijlert. In Rome he lodged at the palace of Vincenzo Giustiniani, where he painted Christ Before the High Priest, now in London's National Gallery. Giustiniani had an important art collection, and Honthorst was especially influenced by the contemporary artists, including Caravaggio, Bartolomeo Manfredi and the Carracci. He was particularly known for his depiction of artificially lit scenes. Cardinal Scipione Borghese became another important patron, securing important commissions for him at San Silvestro Della Mariro, Montecompatri, and at Santa Maria della Vittoria in Rome. He also worked for Cosimo II de' Medici, Grand Duke of Tuscany.

Return to Utrecht
Honthorst returned to Utrecht in 1620, and went on to build a considerable reputation both in the Dutch Republic and abroad. In 1623, the year of his marriage, he was president of the Guild of St. Luke in Utrecht. He soon became so fashionable that Sir Dudley Carleton, then English envoy at The Hague, recommended his works to the Earl of Arundel and Lord Dorchester. In 1626 Honthorst hosted a dinner for Rubens, and painted him as the honest man sought for and found by Diogenes.

Royal patronage
Queen Elizabeth of Bohemia, sister of Charles I of England and Electress Palatine, then in exile in the Netherlands, commissioned Honthorst as a painter and employed him as a drawing-master for her children. Through her he became known to Charles, who invited him to England in 1628. There he painted several portraits, and a vast allegory, now at Hampton Court, of Charles and his queen as Diana and Apollo in the clouds receiving the Duke of Buckingham as Mercury and guardian of the King of Bohemia's children. He painted a more intimate group portrait of The Four Eldest Children of the King of Bohemia, (also at Hampton Court) in which the two eldest are depicted as Diana and Apollo.

After his return to Utrecht, Honthorst retained the patronage of the English monarch, painting for him, in 1631, a large picture of the king and queen of Bohemia and all their children. At around the same time he painted some pictures illustrating the Odyssey for Lord Dorchester, and some showing incidents of Danish history for Christian IV of Denmark. He also painted a portrait of the king's daughter Countess Leonora while she was in the Hague.

His popularity in the Netherlands was such that he opened a second studio in the Hague, where he painted portraits of members of the court, and taught drawing. These large studios, where the work included making replicas of Honthorst's royal portraits, employed a large number of pupils and assistants; according to one pupil, Joachim von Sandrart, describing his experiences in the mid-1620s, Honthorst would have about 24 students at any one time, each paying 100 guilders a year for their education.

His brother Willem van Honthorst (1594–1666) was also a portrait painter. Many of Willem's paintings were previously misattributed to Gerrit due to the similarity of their signatures. Willem was a pupil of Abraham Bloemaert, and was also taught by his own elder brother. In 1646 he went to Berlin, where he became court painter to Louise-Henriette, wife of the elector Frederick II of Brandenburg. He returned to Utrecht in 1664.

Nickname
Honthorst is often referred to as "Gherardo delle notti" ("Gerrit of the Nights") by modern Italians. However, the nickname does not actually appear in any known Italian sources dating before Honthorst's death. Surviving Italian documents from before 1656 refer to the artist as either "Gherardo Fiammingo" ("Gerrit the Fleming") or "Gherardo Hollandese" ("Gerrit the Dutchman"), emphasizing his foreignness rather than his trademark skill at rendering nocturnal lighting. It was only in the 18th century that the nickname "Gherardo delle notti" came into widespread use.

Legacy
Honthorst was a prolific artist. His most attractive pieces are those in which he cultivates the style of Caravaggio, often tavern scenes with musicians, gamblers and people eating. He had great skill at chiaroscuro, often painting scenes illuminated by a single candle. 

Some of his pieces were portraits of the Duke of Buckingham and his family (Hampton Court), the King and Queen of Bohemia (Hanover and Combe Abbey), Marie de Medici (Amsterdam Stadthuis), 1628, the Stadtholders and their Wives (Amsterdam and The Hague), Charles Louis and Rupert, Charles I's nephews (Musée du Louvre, St Petersburg, Combe Abbey and Willin), and Baron Craven (National Portrait Gallery, London). His early style can be seen in the Lute-player (1614) in the Louvre, the Martyrdom of St John in Santa Maria della Scala at Rome, or the Liberation of Peter in the Berlin Museum.

His 1620 The Adoration of the Shepherds in the Uffizi was destroyed in the Via dei Georgofili Massacre of 1993.

Honthorst's 1623 The Concert was purchased for an undisclosed sum by the National Gallery of Art in Washington, D.C., from a private collection in France in November 2013. The painting had not been on view since 1795. The  The Concert went on display for the first time in 218 years in a special installation at the National Gallery of Art's West Building on 23 November 2013. It remained there for six months before going on permanent display in the museum's Dutch and Flemish galleries.

Gallery

References

Sources

 Filippo Baldinucci's Artists in biographies by Filippo Baldinucci, 1610–1670, p. 198  Internet Archive

External links

Gerrit-van-honthorst.org Works by Gerrit van Honthorst
Picture gallery at WGA
Reproduction of The Laughing Violinist 
Works and literature at PubHist
Vermeer and The Delft School, an exhibition catalog from The Metropolitan Museum of Art (fully available online as PDF), which contains material on Gerard van Honthorst
Dutch and Flemish paintings from the Hermitage, an exhibition catalog from The Metropolitan Museum of Art (fully available online as PDF), which contains material on Gerard van Honthorst (cat. no. 12)

1592 births
1656 deaths
Dutch Golden Age painters
Dutch male painters
Dutch genre painters
Dutch portrait painters
Artists from Utrecht
Painters from Utrecht
Sibling artists
Caravaggisti